Next page may refer to:

Page down key
⎘ (U+2398 "Next Page" Unicode Character)
Next Page Private High School